Matthew Jaensch (born 18 September 1989) is a former professional Australian rules football player for the Adelaide Football Club in the Australian Football League (AFL). Jaensch was Adelaide's third selection in the 2009 Rookie Draft, taken at pick #46.

Pre-AFL career
Jaensch commenced his junior career in the Hills Football League with the Hahndorf Football Club, before working his way through the underage ranks at SANFL club . He impressed Adelaide scouts after a break-out season with Sturt in 2009, in which he played 20 league games and kicked the winning goal in the preliminary final against . Jaensch was previously an apprentice electrician and supported  prior to being drafted.

AFL career
Jaensch made his AFL debut in round 6, 2010, against . He played eleven games for the season, playing mainly as a small forward. He shifted to defence in 2011 to great effect, playing 13 games before missing the last month of the season with a shoulder injury. He continued to impress in the first half of 2012, with his offensive run and long kicking a highlight, before struggling in the latter half with a groin injury that eventually required surgery. Jaensch was in and out of the side in 2013, playing 11 games at half-back and half-forward, where he was trialled to bolster the struggling forward line.

In 2014, Jaensch had a career-best season, playing all 22 games. Playing as a running defender, he led the club in marks and was second in metres gained. In round 7, 2015, in a match against , Jaensch suffered an anterior cruciate ligament injury and missed the rest of the season. He was charged with drink driving during his rehabilitation from the injury.

Jaensch announced his retirement from AFL football in February 2016.

Statistics

|- style="background:#eaeaea;"
! scope="row" style="text-align:center" | 2010
|
| 48 || 11 || 7 || 4 || 82 || 51 || 133 || 43 || 34 || 0.6 || 0.4 || 7.5 || 4.6 || 12.1 || 3.9 || 3.1
|-
! scope="row" style="text-align:center" | 2011
|
| 10 || 13 || 4 || 2 || 145 || 95 || 240 || 50 || 30 || 0.3 || 0.2 || 11.2 || 7.3 || 18.5 || 3.9 || 2.3
|- style="background:#eaeaea;"
! scope="row" style="text-align:center" | 2012
|
| 10 || 10 || 3 || 2 || 102 || 42 || 144 || 42 || 22 || 0.3 || 0.2 || 10.2 || 4.2 || 14.4 || 4.2 || 2.2
|-
! scope="row" style="text-align:center" | 2013
|
| 10 || 11 || 4 || 3 || 96 || 44 || 140 || 47 || 27 || 0.4 || 0.3 || 8.7 || 4.0 || 12.7 || 4.3 || 2.5
|- style="background:#eaeaea;"
! scope="row" style="text-align:center" | 2014
|
| 10 || 22 || 7 || 5 || 297 || 166 || 463 || 126 || 54 || 0.3 || 0.2 || 13.5 || 7.6 || 21.1 || 5.7 || 2.5
|-
! scope="row" style="text-align:center" | 2015
|
| 10 || 7 || 0 || 2 || 110 || 32 || 142 || 57 || 17 || 0.0 || 0.3 || 15.7 || 4.6 || 20.3 || 8.1 || 2.4
|- style="background:#eaeaea;"
! scope="row" style="text-align:center" | 2016
|
| 10 || 0 || — || — || — || — || — || — || — || — || — || — || — || — || — || —
|- class="sortbottom"
! colspan=3| Career
! 74
! 25
! 18
! 832
! 430
! 1262
! 365
! 184
! 0.3
! 0.2
! 11.2
! 5.8
! 17.1
! 4.9
! 2.5
|}

References

External links

1989 births
Living people
Australian people of German descent
Australian rules footballers from South Australia
Adelaide Football Club players
Sturt Football Club players
People from Hahndorf, South Australia